Wiggins is a statutory town in Morgan County, Colorado, United States. The population was 1,401 as of the 2020 census, up from 893 at the 2010 census.

The community was established in 1882 as the Burlington Railroad depot of "Corona". Around 1900, Corona was renamed in honor of Oliver P. Wiggins, who had served as a guide and scout for Captain John C. Frémont on some of his explorations through northern Colorado in the 1840s and who had accompanied Kit Carson for 12 years on his expeditions.

Geography
Wiggins is in western Morgan County on the south side of Interstate 76, which leads east  to Fort Morgan, the county seat, and southwest  to Denver. U.S. Route 34 splits off from I-76 just north of the town, leading northwest  to Greeley.

Demographics

As of the census of 2000, there were 838 people, 265 households, and 210 families residing in the town. The racial makeup of the town was 82.10% White, 1.19% African American, 2.27% Native American, 12.89% from other races, and 1.55% from two or more races. Hispanic or Latino of any race were 25.06% of the population.

There were 265 households, out of which 46.8% had children under the age of 18 living with them, 62.6% were married couples living together, 10.9% had a female householder with no husband present, and 20.4% were non-families. 17.0% of all households were made up of individuals, and 7.2% had someone living alone who was 65 years of age or older.  The average household size was 3.16 and the average family size was 3.52.

The age of the town's population is spread out, with 37.0% under the age of 18, 7.8% from 18 to 24, 28.0% from 25 to 44, 19.6% from 45 to 64, and 7.6% who were 65 years of age or older.  The median age was 30 years. For every 100 females, there were 100.5 males.  For every 100 females age 18 and over, there were 98.5 males.

The median income for a household in the town was $33,438, and the median income for a family was $34,219. Males had a median income of $26,296 versus $20,833 for females. The per capita income for the town was $11,827.  About 15.0% of families and 14.8% of the population were below the poverty line, including 16.1% of those under age 18 and none of those age 65 or over.

Education
Wiggins is home to the Wiggins RE-50J school district. The district includes Wiggins Elementary School, Wiggins Middle School and Wiggins High School.

See also

Morgan County, Colorado
Fort Morgan, CO Micropolitan Statistical Area

References

External links
Town of Wiggins contacts
CDOT map of the Town of Wiggins

Towns in Morgan County, Colorado
Towns in Colorado